Oluseye Desmond Sodamola, professionally known as Spinall (styize as SPINALL; formerly DJ Spinall), is a Nigerian disc jockey, record producer, songwriter, label executive, and media personality. He first gained prominence in 2004, while working as a radio DJ at Raypower 100.5 FM. He later joined Industry Nite where he promoted underground talents at the weekly platform. He was the official DJ to Wande Coal while he was affiliated with Mavin Records. He created a style edge to his outfit known as TheCAP, tracing his roots back to his culture. TheCAP, which fans tags as "TheCrazyAzzParty" has since then been his brand power and identity. Prior to April 2021, he went by the stage name DJ Spinall, and started an Afromix series on Apple Music, on 15 April 2021. and hosted a television show, known as Smirnoff Infamous Mix on MTV Base, Soundcity TV with a podcast series launched on Audiomack and various radio stations in Nigeria. On 6 April 2021, Smirnoff Infamous Mix first episode featured guest appearance from Wurld.

In 2014, he launched TheCAPMusic, a record label/management company. In the following year, he signed producers to the TheCAPMusic. Top Boy as he is popularly called, released his first hit single "GbaGbe E" in 2014 featuring Burna Boy. He has collaborated with other acts such as; 2Baba, Wizkid, Wande Coal, Davido, Mr Eazi, Tiwa Savage, Kizz Daniel, and many more.

Spinall's debut album My Story: The Album (2015) with breakthrough singles "Oluwa", "Gba Gbe E", and "Money". In the following year, on 10 October 2016, DJ Spinall released his second album titled TEN. The album features Davido, Sauti Sol, Mr Eazi, among others, with lead singles "Package" featuring Davido & "Ohema" featuring Mr Eazi. His third studio albums, Dreams was released on 8 October 2017 with singles "Opoju", "Calm Down", and "Gimme Luv". On 26 October 2018, he released his 4th studio album Iyanu. The album features two lead singles including "Nowo", OkayAfrica refers to as one of 15 biggest Nigerian songs of 2018 featuring Wizkid, which also peaked on MTV Base Official Naija Top 10 Countdown and "Baba" featuring Kizz Daniel, which made it to MTV Base Top 20 Hottest Naija tracks of 2018. On 11 December 2020, he released his 5th studio album Grace, under TheCAP Music with 5 self-produced songs. The album features the top-six songs, "Dis Love" featuring Wizkid & Tiwa Savage, "Sere" featuring Fireboy DML, "Pressure" featuring Dice Ailes, "Everytime" featuring Kranium, "Tonight" featuring Omah Lay, and "EDI" featuring Reminisce.

In 2015, Spinall became the first African DJ to perform at the SXSW festival in Austin, Texas, with other supporting acts to join Spinall on stage including; Davido, Sarkodie, R2Bees with host Eddie Kadi. He is also the first Nigerian DJ to tour 5 cities in United States, including New York City, Miami, Houston, Austin, and Washington, D.C. In 2017, he was the official DJ for BET Awards in Los Angeles, California. The award was aired across the globe, which also gained him worldwide attention as a Disc Jockey pioneering Afrobeat to the world. On 21 April 2019, Spinall became the first Nigerian DJ to headline a show at XOYO in London and the first Nigerian DJ to perform at the Glastonbury Festival on 29 June 2019.

On 13 May 2022, Spinall released "PALAZZO", featuring Asake, and co-written by Olamide. On 22 May 2022, it debuted at number 6 on the UK Afrobeats Singles chart, and reached number 4. On 23 May 2022, it debuted at number 2 on the Nigeria TurnTable Top 50 chart. On 25 May 2022, it debuted at number 6 on the Billboard U.S. Afrobeats Songs. On 11 July 2022, it debuted on the newly launched TurnTable Top 100, an expansion of the Top 50, at number 5. On 13 July 2022, following the initial launch of the Nigeria TurnTable Top Radio Songs chart, it debut at number 7, and number 4 at the Nigeria TurnTable Top Streaming Songs chart.

Music career

Early life and TheCAP Music

Oluseye Desmond Sodamola was born on June 2, 1984, in Lagos and he is the third of five siblings. He attained his primary and secondary school education in Lagos State, then moved to Ogun State, to study Electrical and Electronics Engineering at Olabisi Onabanjo University, where he received his BSc degree.

Spinall's first musical experience as a kid, was listening to some vinyl records been played by his parents and according to him "In the morning my dad would wake up, and open the drawers, and start playing some Fela Kuti, and King Sunny Adé records". This shaped him and fueled his passion for music after watching a DJ he hired to play in high school.

2017–18: Dreams, and Iyanu
His third studio album Dreams was released independently by TheCAP Music on 8 October 2017. The album featured guest appearances from Niniola, Wurld, Ycee, Wizkid, Simi, Mr Eazi, Harrysong, Davido, Wande Coal, Reekado Banks, and Olamide. The album lead singles include: "Opoju" featuring Wizkid, "Calm Down" featuring Mr Eazi, and "Gimme Luv" featuring Olamide. On 18 November 2017, Spinall announced Party Of Your Dreams album launch on 26 November at Grand Ballroom of Oriental Hotel, Victoria Island, Lagos and in 2018, Spinall announced the second edition of Party of Your Dreams in Lagos on 7 December 2018, with supporting DJs; DJ Big N, DJ Consequence, DJ Enimoney, DJ Lambo, and more to play at the event. In 2019, Sodamola had his first UK headline concert in London tagged Party of Your Dreams on 21 April 2019 at XOYO!.

On 24 October 2018, DJ Spinall shared featured acts and producers on his fourth studio album Iyanu. Guests on the album are Wizkid, Kizz Daniel, Davido, Burna Boy, Tekno, Nonso Amadi, Wurld, Dotman, and more. The album was exclusively produced by DJ Spinall and co-produced by Killertunes, CKAY, Nonso Amadi, Benie Macaulay and Stg. The album lead singles include: "Nowo" featuring Wizkid and "Baba" featuring Kizz Daniel. The album was released independently by TheCAP Music on 26 October 2018.

2019-2020: Beyoncé Presents: Making The Gift, and The Recording Academy

In 2019, Beyoncé released an hour-long documentary special entitled Beyoncé Presents: Making The Gift. The television film was shot in Egypt, Nigeria, South Africa, and United States. The documentary was aired 16 September on ABC, where DJ Spinall appeared and spoke about the album The Lion King: The Gift, the basis of the documentary.

In 2020, Spinall was among the 2,300 music executive inductees into The Recording Academy's class of 2020, alongside Bankulli, Lil Nas X, Gunna, Victoria Monét, Juls, among others for the 63rd Annual Grammy Awards. On 26 July 2020, Spinall spoke about The Grammy Award at This Sunday show with DJ Cuppy on Africa Now Radio via Apple Music. He was also among several celebrities such as D'banj, Praiz and Olisa to attend an exclusive party hosted by MTN for the data-bundled music service MusicTour.

Top Boy Album 
On 13 February 2023, Spinall shared the official art cover to his sixth studio album on his various social media.

According to Bomi Anifowose from African Folder, DJ Spinall's Top Boy album borrows a rich collage of African sounds mingling with Western music elements such as synths and electronic chordophones, certifying the body of work as yet another successful sonic experiment.

Recording, publishing and distributions deals
On 11 September 2018, He signed international major deal with Atlantic Records UK and a publishing deal with Warner Chappell Music UK.

Endorsements
He signed a deal with Guinness Nigeria as Smirnoff Brand Ambassador in 2015 and renewed the contract in 2016, 2017, 2018 and 2019. On 20 March 2018, Spinall signed a multi million naira deal with Pepsi Nigeria.

Notable performances
He has performed in several popular events and shows since his rise to stardom, performed in events like:
One Lagos Brand Launch (2016)
One Africa Music Fest New York (2017)
BET Awards 2017 Official DJ (2017)
Mixmag New York Gig (2017)
MixMag "The LAB" New York (2018)
Africa All Star Music Fest Toronto (2018)
One Africa Music Fest, London (2018)
One Africa Music Fest, Dubai (2019)
Glastonbury Festival (2019)
Ends Festival (2019) 
Afro Nation, Portugal (2019)
Afro Nation, Ghana (2019)
Bruno Mars Live and Exclusive, Sydney (2022)
MTV Europe Music Awards, Germany (2022)

Tours
TheCAPUS Tour 3.0 2018, kicked-off on 4 August in Washington, D.C. The tour commencement in 9 cities, cities include Washington, D.C., Minnesota, New York City, Miami, Toronto, Dallas, Atlanta, Indiana and Jacksonville, Florida.

Others

TheCAPSouthAfrican Tour
TheCAPUS Tour
Party Of Your Dreams London
Party Of Your Dreams Lagos
TheCAPUK Tour

Discography

Albums

Selected singles
"Oluwa" (feat. M.I Abaga) (2014)
"Excuse Me" (feat. Timaya) (2015)
"Attendance" (feat. Olamide) (2015)
"No Sorrow" (feat. Pheelz) (2015)
"Package" (feat. Davido and Del B) (2016)
"Ohema" (feat. Mr Eazi) (2016)
"Pepe Dem" (feat. Yemi Alade) 2017
"Nowo" (feat. Wizkid) (2018)
"Baba" (feat. Kiss Daniel) (2018)
"Omoge" (feat. Dotman) (2018)
"What Do You See?" (feat Kojo Funds) (2019)
"Dis Love" (feat Wizkid & Tiwa Savage) (2019)
"When it comes to you Remix" (feat Sean Paul & DJ Spinall ft Tiwa Savage) (2019)
"EDI" (feat Reminisce) (2019)
"Pressure"  (feat Dice Ailes) (2020)
"Everytime" (feat Kranium) (2020)
"Tonight" (feat Omah Lay) (2020)
"Sere" (feat Fireboy DML) (2020)
"Cloud 9" (feat Adekunle Gold) (2021)
"PALAZZO" (with. Asake) (2022)
"Bunda" (with. Kemuel & Olamide) (2023)

Videography

Awards and nominations

See also 
 List of Nigerian DJs

References

Nigerian music industry executives
Living people
Yoruba radio personalities
Nigerian radio presenters
Nigerian hip hop DJs
Nigerian record producers
Musicians from Lagos State
Yoruba musicians
Olabisi Onabanjo University alumni
21st-century Nigerian musicians
1984 births